Jarry station is a Montreal Metro station in the borough of Villeray–Saint-Michel–Parc-Extension in Montreal, Quebec, Canada. It is operated by the Société de transport de Montréal (STM) and serves the Orange Line. The station opened on October 14, 1966, as part of the original network of the Metro.

Overview 
The station, designed by Lemoyne, Bland, Edwards, & Shine, is a normal side platform station, built in tunnel. The mezzanine near the north end is connected to an entrance integrated into the ground floor of an apartment building. The station is known for the diamond-shaped caissons  in the ceiling of the transept.

Origin of the name
This station is named for rue Jarry, which in turn commemorates Bernard Bleignier dit Jarry, who received a concession in 1700 that later became the village of Saint-Laurent. The street was built on land belonging to Stanislas Bleignier Jarry Sr. (patriarch), a descendant of Bernard Jarry, who was mayor of the village in 1907. Stanislas' son was Raoul Jarry.

Connecting bus routes

Nearby points of interest
 Parc Jarry (Jarry Park)
 Centre d'emploi du Canada (Canada Employment Centre)
 Stade IGA (Via 193 West)

References

External links
 Jarry Station - official site
 Montreal by Metro, metrodemontreal.com - photos, information, and trivia
 Metro Map

Orange Line (Montreal Metro)
Railway stations in Canada opened in 1966
Villeray–Saint-Michel–Parc-Extension
Articles containing video clips